The following lists events that happened in 1970 in Iceland.

Incumbents
President – Kristján Eldjárn
Prime Minister – Bjarni Benediktsson, Jóhann Hafstein

Events

Births

26 January – Bjarni Benediktsson, politician
16 March – Paul Oscar, pop singer, songwriter and disc jockey.

Deaths

References

 
1970s in Iceland
Iceland
Iceland
Years of the 20th century in Iceland